Kathleen Jacobs Kelly (born 1954) is an American biologist specializing in genetic regulation of cell growth, cancer progression, and metastasis. She is chief of the laboratory of genitourinary cancer pathogenesis (LGCP) and deputy director of the National Cancer Institute Center for Cancer Research.

Education 
Kelly earned a Ph.D. from the University of California, Irvine. Her 1980 dissertation was titled Genetic and biochemical aspects of B lymphocytes responses to bacterial lipopolysaccharides. She completed postdoctoral training in the laboratory of Philip Leder, Harvard Medical School.

Career 
Kelly has maintained an independent research program at the National Cancer Institute (NCI) since 1984. She is chief of the laboratory of genitourinary cancer pathogenesis (LGCP) and deputy director of the NCI Center for Cancer Research.

Research 
Kelly's interests have focused on the genetic regulation of cell growth, cancer progression and metastasis. Her program investigates mechanisms of prostate cancer tumorigenesis and progression. A major area of focus addresses the roles of oncogenotype, tumor heterogeneity/cancer stem cells, and metabolism in the development of therapeutic responses, especially for castrate resistant prostate cancer. Additional research investigates signal transduction pathways that influence prostate cancer bone metastasis. As chief of LGCP, Kelly advances integration with the clinical prostate cancer program to carry out mechanism-based translational research using a variety of pathological, genomic, and patient-derived live culture approaches.

References 

Living people
Place of birth missing (living people)
University of California, Irvine alumni
National Institutes of Health people
Cancer researchers
American medical researchers
20th-century American women scientists
21st-century American women scientists
Women medical researchers
American women biologists
20th-century American biologists
21st-century American biologists
1954 births